Evan D. Goldberg (born September 15, 1982) is a Canadian filmmaker and comedian. He has collaborated with his childhood friend Seth Rogen on the films Superbad, Pineapple Express, This Is the End, The Interview, and Good Boys.

Personal life
Evan Goldberg was born September 15, 1982 in Vancouver, British Columbia, to a Jewish family. He was raised in Marpole. He attended Point Grey Secondary School (where he met and befriended Rogen) and McGill University, and is married to Lisa (Yadavaia) Goldberg.

Career
Goldberg started his writing career joining the staff of Da Ali G Show for its 2004 season, along with his childhood friend and comedy partner Seth Rogen. They collaborated on the films, Knocked Up, Superbad, Pineapple Express, Funny People, and The Green Hornet with their production company Point Grey Pictures, named after Point Grey Secondary School.

In a strategy to garner interest and funding, Goldberg created a pre-production trailer for Jay and Seth versus the Apocalypse, which was later made as This Is the End, and was released in June 2013.

During the time, both Rogen and Goldberg through his Point Grey Pictures company had set up a joint venture with major client Good Universe to set up mainstream comedy films.

Goldberg and Rogen are both "obsessed" fans of The Simpsons. After learning that The Simpsons executive producer James L. Brooks was a fan of Superbad, they decided to ask the producers of the show if they could write an episode. They were invited to The Simpsons writers room, where they pitched several episode ideas. One was accepted, and they wrote an outline with the help of some feedback from the regular writers. It became the episode "Homer the Whopper", which was the season premiere of season twenty-one.

Goldberg has a chapter giving advice in Tim Ferriss' book Tools of Titans.

Filmography

Film

Television

Awards and nominations

References

External links 

Interview at the WGA

1982 births
Film producers from British Columbia
Canadian male screenwriters
Comedy film directors
Jewish Canadian writers
McGill University alumni
Living people
Film directors from Vancouver
Canadian television writers
Writers from Vancouver
Jewish Canadian filmmakers